The 69th Pennsylvania House of Representatives District is located in southern Pennsylvania and has been represented by Carl Walker Metzgar since 2009.

District profile
The 69th District is located in Somerset County and includes the following areas:

Addison
Addison Township
 Allegheny Township
Benson
Berlin
 Black Township
Boswell
 Brothersvalley Township
 Callimont
 Casselman
Central City
Conemaugh Township
Confluence
Elk Lick Township
 Fairhope Township
Garrett
 Greenville Township
 Hooversville
 Indian Lake
 Jefferson Township
Jenner Township
Jennerstown
 Larimer Township
 Lincoln Township
Lower Turkeyfoot Township
Meyersdale
 Middlecreek Township
 Milford Township
 New Baltimore
 New Centerville
 Northampton Township
 Quemahoning Township
 Rockwood
Salisbury
 Seven Springs (Somerset County Portion)
 Shade Township
 Shanksville
 Somerset
 Somerset Township
 Southampton Township
 Stonycreek Township
 Stoystown
Summit Township
Upper Turkeyfoot Township
Ursina
 Wellersburg

Representatives

References

Government of Bedford County, Pennsylvania
Government of Somerset County, Pennsylvania
69